Steve Ressel (born October 12, 1967) is an American comic book artist, animator, storyboard artist, producer and director. Steve directed animated series such as Invader Zim, The Wild Thornberrys, Duckman, Stressed Eric, God, the Devil and Bob, Rugrats and others. Ressel directed and produced the entire run of Invader Zim.

After Invader Zim he went on to develop his own ideas. "Trubble Bub", a CGI children's program focusing on problem solving and behavior, was animated as a pilot. It was scripted and designed for a direct-to-DVD project but never got off the ground.

Writing and comics
He resides in Clifford, North Dakota, writing screenplays, novels, non-fictions, and his comic book, "The Lost Boys".

Steve is currently writing trance, pop, rock, ballads, and country music.

Grooming allegations
On 2020 video essayist and podcaster Shannon Strucci came out on Twitter with allegations of having being groomed by Ressel when she was a teenager, sharing on a thread several screenshots of inappropriate messages and art pieces he send her during that time.

Bibliography

 Animation : The Inner Workings (2010)  Textbook. 
 State of One (2010)  Novel. 
 Classy Drinks For The Noob (2010) Non-fiction. 
 Ugly Girl (2010) Novella. 
 The Lost Boys (2010) Compilation.   
 Perverted Communion (2010) Novel. 
 Rise Again, Ugly Girl (2011) Novel. 
 Breaking Hooke (2011) Novella. 
 Return, Ugly Girl (2011) Novel. 
 The Complete Ugly Girl (2011) Compilation. 
 Mud World (2013) Gonzo Noir Anthology. 
 Animation Reference (2013) Private reference textbook.   
 Spikey-Sparkle's Singular Sacrosanct Sojourn (2015) Young fiction - Illustrated.  
 The Lost Boys : NutsHell (2016) Graphic novel.   
 The Lost Boys Threads, Knots, Snarls & Snobs (2016) 500pp. comic digest. 
 The Stories in Between: A Between Books Anthology (2010) 4-page comic capping the anthology.

Filmography
 Rocko's Modern Life (1993)  Storyboard Clean-up.  Various episodes.
 WildC.A.T.S. (1994)  Storyboards.  Various episodes.
 Aaahh!!! Real Monsters (1995)  Storyboards.  Various episodes.
 Duckman (1995)  Director & Storyboards.  Various episodes.
 Santo Bugito (1996)  Storyboards.  Various episodes.
 Jumanji (1996)  Director.  Various episodes, created opening sequence.
 Stressed Eric (1997)  Director.  Two episodes.
 Wild Thornberries (1998)  Director.  Eight episodes.
 Rugrats (1999)  Director.  Various episodes.
 Rocket Power (1999)  Director.  Various episodes.
 God, The Devil and Bob (1999)  Director.  Three episodes.
 Invader Zim (2001)  Producer & Director.  All episodes except for the 1999 pilot.
 Trubble Bub (2004) Creator, Writer, Producer, Director, Voices, Boards, Designs, Timing.

Awards 
 29th Annual Annie Award for Outstanding Individual Achievement for Storyboarding in an Animated Television Production.
 2001 World Animation Celebration for Best Title Sequence. Invader Zim

References

External links
 

Living people
1967 births
Annie Award winners
American animators
American comics artists
American comics writers
American storyboard artists
American illustrators
American television directors
American television producers
American animated film directors
American animated film producers
American male screenwriters
American male television writers
American television writers
American publishers (people)
Musicians from Delaware
Screenwriters from Delaware
People from Traill County, North Dakota
Screenwriters from North Dakota
Musicians from North Dakota